This is a list of tornadoes that have been officially or unofficially labeled as F4, EF4, IF4, or an equivalent rating during the 2010s decade. These scales – the Fujita scale, the Enhanced Fujita scale, the International Fujita scale, and the TORRO tornado intensity scale – attempt to estimate the intensity of a tornado by classifying the damage caused to natural features and man-made structures in the tornado's path.

Tornadoes are among the most violent known meteorological phenomena. Each year, more than 2,000 tornadoes are recorded worldwide, with the vast majority occurring in North America and Europe. To assess the intensity of these events, meteorologist Ted Fujita devised a method to estimate maximum wind speeds within tornadic storms based on the damage caused; this became known as the Fujita scale. The scale ranks tornadoes from F0 to F5, with F0 being the least intense and F5 being the most intense.

Following two particularly devastating tornadoes in 1997 and 1999, engineers questioned the reliability of the Fujita scale. Ultimately, a new scale was devised that took into account 28 different damage indicators; this became known as the Enhanced Fujita scale. The Enhanced Fujita scale is used predominantly in North America. Most of Europe, on the other hand, uses the TORRO tornado intensity scale (or T-Scale), which ranks tornado intensity between T0 and T11; F4/EF4 tornadoes are approximately equivalent to T8 to T9 on the T-Scale. Tornadoes rated IF4 on the International Fujita scale are also included on this list. Violent tornadoes, those rated F4/EF4 and F5/EF5 are rare and only make up 2% of all recorded tornadoes.

List 
In the 2010s decade, 72 tornadoes were rated F4/EF4. 59 of these occurred in the United States, five occurred in China, with one occurring in each Australia, Brazil, Canada, Cuba, Italy, Russia, and South Africa for a total of 12 F4/EF4 tornadoes outside of the United States. 70 tornadoes were rated EF4 with Italy's and South Africa's only violent tornadoes during the decade being rated F4.

See also 
 Tornado intensity and damage
 List of tornadoes and tornado outbreaks
 List of F5 and EF5 tornadoes
 List of F4 and EF4 tornadoes
 List of F4 and EF4 tornadoes (2020–present)
 List of tornadoes striking downtown areas
 Tornado myths

Notes

References 

 
Tornado-related lists
2010s natural disasters